Lake Joanna is a spring-fed lake in Lake County, Florida. It occupies an area of 334.74 acres.

References

Joanna
Joanna